Luke George Evans (born 15 April 1979) is a Welsh actor and singer. He began his career on the stage, performing in many of London's West End productions such as Rent, Miss Saigon, and Piaf before making his film breakthrough in the Clash of the Titans 2010 remake. Following his debut, Evans was cast in such action and thriller films as Immortals (2011), The Raven (2012), and the re-imagined The Three Musketeers (2011).

In 2013, Evans starred as the antagonist Owen Shaw in the blockbuster Fast & Furious 6, and also played Bard the Bowman in Peter Jackson's three-part adaptation of J. R. R. Tolkien's The Hobbit. Evans also portrayed the vampire Dracula in the character's 2014 film origin story, Dracula Untold. Evans portrayed Gaston in Disney's live-action adaptation of Beauty and the Beast (2017), psychologist William Moulton Marston in the biographical drama Professor Marston and the Wonder Women (2017), and the Coachman in the Disney's live-action remake of Pinocchio (2022). He released his debut album, At Last, on 22 November 2019. In 2020, he starred in a three-part miniseries The Pembrokeshire Murders. In 2021, he had a main role in the Hulu drama miniseries Nine Perfect Strangers. He then starred in the black ops military series Echo 3 (2022).

Early life and education
Luke George Evans was born on Easter Sunday, 15 April 1979, in Pontypool, and brought up in Aberbargoed, the only child of Yvonne and David Evans. He was raised as a Jehovah's Witness, though he left the religion when he was 16 and left school at the same time.

At age 17, he moved to Cardiff, where he studied with singing coach Louise Ryan. In 1997, he won a scholarship to London Studio Centre, then in Kings Cross, London. He graduated in 2000.

Career

From 2000 to 2008, Evans starred in many West End productions including La Cava, Taboo, Rent, Miss Saigon and Avenue Q, as well as several fringe shows in London and at the Edinburgh Festival.

In 2008, he landed his most significant stage role playing Vincent in the play Small Change written and directed by Peter Gill at the Donmar Warehouse. His performance drew attention from film casting directors and U.S. talent agencies, and he was nominated for the Evening Standard Award for Outstanding Newcomer. Later that same year he did his second show at the Donmar Warehouse, Piaf, in which he played Yves Montand.

Evans had his first film audition at age thirty. In 2009, he landed his first film role, playing the Greek god Apollo in the 2010 remake Clash of the Titans. Also in 2010, he appeared as Clive in the film Sex & Drugs & Rock & Roll, directed by Matt Whitecross, as the Sheriff of Nottingham's thug in Robin Hood, alongside Matthew Macfadyen (whom he would later play alongside again in The Three Musketeers), and played handyman and good guy Andy, in director Stephen Frears' film Tamara Drewe, based on Posy Simmond's comic strip. Evans went on to portray DI Craig Stokes in Blitz (2011), the film adaptation of Ken Bruen's novel of the same name, in which he starred with Jason Statham and Paddy Considine. In early 2010, he shot the independent film, Flutter, directed by Giles Borg.

Evans played the Musketeer Aramis in Paul W. S. Anderson's version of The Three Musketeers (filmed in 2010 and released in 2011). He was cast in a lead role in Tarsem Singh's Greek epic, Immortals (2011), in which he played the King of the Gods, Zeus. And at the end of 2010, he took a role opposite John Cusack in James McTeigue's film The Raven, replacing Jeremy Renner. In the film, released in 2012 and set in mid-nineteenth century Baltimore, Evans played Detective Emmett Fields, who investigates a series of murders inspired by the poetry and short stories of Edgar Allan Poe. Shooting took place in Budapest and Serbia in November 2010. In 2011, he shot No One Lives, a psychological horror film directed by Ryuhei Kitamura, in New Orleans, and began filming a role in Peter Jackson's three-part adaptation of J. R. R. Tolkien's The Hobbit, playing the role of Bard the Bowman.

In 2013, Evans played the antagonist Owen Shaw in Fast & Furious 6, and in 2014, he played Dracula in the film Dracula Untold. Evans was cast as Eric Draven in the reboot of The Crow. In June 2014, he joined the cast of the film High-Rise with Tom Hiddleston and Jeremy Irons. In January 2015, Evans officially exited The Crow to pursue other projects. The same year, GQ named him one of the 50 best dressed British men.

In 2016, Evans appeared in the thriller film The Girl on the Train, co-starring Emily Blunt. In 2017, he had the villainous role of Gaston in Disney's live-action adaptation of Beauty and the Beast, directed by Bill Condon and co-starring Emma Watson and Dan Stevens. Evans was also set to reprise his role as Gaston in a Beauty and the Beast prequel limited series for Disney+,  alongside Josh Gad, who was serving as co-creator, co-writer and executive producer).

He also played the lead role, William Moulton Marston, the creator of Wonder Woman, in the film Professor Marston and the Wonder Women.

In 2018, Evans starred in TNT drama The Alienist, as newspaper illustrator John Moore. The following year, he announced the release of his debut studio album, At Last, which was released on 22 November 2019.

On 8 November 2019, Evans starred in Roland Emmerich's epic war movie Midway, alongside Ed Skrein, Patrick Wilson, Mandy Moore, Aaron Eckhart, Nick Jonas, Dennis Quaid, and Woody Harrelson. 

In 2021, Evans played Lars Lee in the Hulu miniseries, Nine Perfect Strangers, based on the novel of the same name by Liane Moriarty, which features Nicole Kidman in the lead role, alongside Melissa McCarthy, Michael Shannon, Samara Weaving, Asher Keddie, and Bobby Cannavale.

He also played The Coachman in Robert Zemeckis' live-action film adaptation of Disney's Pinocchio, with Tom Hanks.

Evans was awarded Man of the Year at the ninth annual Virgin Atlantic Attitude Awards.

Personal life
Though Evans is openly gay, he is unwilling to discuss his sexuality in the press, asserting his personal life to be private. He deliberately shields his family from the press. When asked about the opinion that Hollywood might have of his sexuality, he argued that his private life is not connected to Hollywood and that "Talent, success, what you do in your personal life – I don't see how one should have an effect on the other."

Between 2014 and 2016, Evans dated actor and model Jon Kortajarena.

Discography

Studio albums

Soundtrack albums

Singles

Tours
 At Last! The Live Tour (2021)

Filmography

Film

Television

Video games

Theme park rides

Awards and nominations

References

Sources

External links

 
 

1979 births
Living people
20th-century Welsh male actors
21st-century Welsh male actors
Welsh gay musicians
Former Jehovah's Witnesses
Welsh LGBT singers
Gay singers
People from Aberbargoed
People from Pontypool
Welsh gay actors
Welsh male film actors
Welsh male stage actors
Welsh male television actors
Welsh male voice actors
20th-century Welsh LGBT people
21st-century Welsh LGBT people